The University Centre in Svalbard (UNIS) is a Norwegian state-owned limited company that is involved in research and provides some higher education in Arctic studies. The company is wholly owned by the Ministry of Education and Research, and the universities of Oslo, Bergen, Tromsø, NTNU and NMBU appoint the board of directors. It is led by a director appointed by the board for a four-year term. The centre is the world’s northernmost research and higher education institution, in Longyearbyen at 78° N latitude. The courses offered fall into five main science disciplines: Arctic biology, Arctic geology, Arctic geophysics, Arctic technology and Arctic safety.

Organization

The centre was established in 1993 in Longyearbyen, a town of 2,100 inhabitants on the western coast of Spitsbergen island. Despite its name, it is not a university (a status that can only be conferred by the government under certain conditions to larger institutions), but a state owned enterprise involved in research and some university-level education. The main idea behind establishing UNIS was that the unique geographic location of the island permits the study of Arctic sciences in situ, right outside the company walls. Its official language is Norwegian, but English is used in all tuition and 68% of its 690 students originate from outside Norway (in 2015, foreign students came from 43 countries). Of the international students, the largest groups were from Nordic countries outside Norway (12%), Germany (11%), the Netherlands (9%), the United Kingdom (6%), and Russia (6%). The tuition is free of charge and is carried out by 27 full-time professors, 43 adjunct professors and 160 guest lecturers. The latter are invited from Norwegian and foreign institutions within various joint research projects. Those projects are also instrumental for the enrollment of master and PhD students – UNIS does not accept its own graduates for those courses and requires potential candidates to present a letter of support from their home institution. One important collaboration is the educational exchange program with Russia. The funding for UNIS is provided by the Norwegian government, research councils and private industry.

Campus and events
The company conducts both teaching and scientific research. The original UNIS building opened in 1995. The new Svalbard Science Centre, designed by Jarmund/Vigsnæs architects, was officially opened on April 26, 2006 by the King and the Queen of Norway. On September 2, 2009, the Secretary-General of the  United Nations, Ban Ki-Moon  visited UNIS. Together with the Norwegian Minister of Environment Erik Solheim, Ban Ki-Moon led a debate on the impact of a melting Arctic on the environment.

The Norwegian Polar Institute, the Svalbard Museum, and the Svalbard Science Forum share the building.

Services
Although UNIS has no formal tuition fee, students are required to pay a semester fee of 580 NOK (about 65 EUR). For overnight scientific cruises, fieldwork and excursions, students must pay a daily rate of NOK 200 for food. UNIS has a library, established in 1993. A significant part of the library is electronic: the company is subscribed to a number of electronic databases that can be accessed from the library computers. UNIS has several research laboratories and a 15 m long research ship Viking explorer.

Most students at UNIS live in five renovated mining barracks in Nybyen (4,150 NOK), a settlement on the southern outskirts of Longyearbyen (30–40 minutes by foot). From September 2014, some students live in the newly built campus Sjøskrenten (4,500–4,600 NOK), which is a 2-minute walk from UNIS. Both campuses are owned and administered by the Arctic Student Welfare Organization in Tromsø.

Safety and well-being
There is a small hospital and a dentist in Longyearbyen, and a search and rescue team led by the Governor of Svalbard. Any seriously ill person is transported by airplane to mainland Norway. The nearest regional hospital is located in Tromsø, a two-hour flight away.

Polar bears are abundant in the area and are a potential threat to human life. As a result, local citizens often carry rifles, and every UNIS student and member of staff spends their first day learning how to use a rifle to defend themselves against bears.

Because UNIS activities include fieldwork carried out on boats, snowmobiles or on foot in a harsh environment, all new students and staff members are required to present a self-declaration confirming that they are in good health.

Student life 
There are various self-organized student groups at UNIS. Many change each semester according to students' areas of interest, whereas some are fixtures. The UNIS student council is elected once per semester and represents the students' interests at university meetings and towards outside parties. Students are able to rent outdoor equipment, such as skiing or camping gear, from the student equipment group, which is also self-organized by students with an interest in outdoor pursuits. Due to nature being easily accessed in the Arctic, outdoor sports and hiking are popular recreational activities for many students.

See also
 List of northernmost items

References

External links

 University Centre in Svalbard

 
Research institutes in Norway
Longyearbyen
Education in Svalbard
Science and technology in Svalbard
1993 establishments in Norway
Organisations based in Longyearbyen